Randhir Singh Gollen is an Indian politician. He was elected to the Haryana Legislative Assembly from Pundri in the 2019 Haryana Legislative Assembly election as an independent candidate. Previously, he was associated with the Bharatiya Janata Party.

References 

1965 births
Living people
Bharatiya Janata Party politicians from Haryana
People from Kaithal district
Haryana MLAs 2019–2024